Gökhan Zan (born 7 September 1981 in Antakya) is a retired Turkish footballer.

Club career
Zan started his career with Hatayspor and then moved on to Çanakkale Dardanelspor before joining Beşiktaş in 2003. He needed time to make his mark with the Turkish giants, and spent a spell on loan with Gaziantepspor before returning to the İnönü Stadium.

Galatasaray
Following 2008–09 season-end, Zan could not negotiate a deal with Beşiktaş. On 22 June 2009, it had been announced that Zan made a deal with Galatasaray for a period of 2 years starting from 2009–10 season. In further rumours, it has been written on papers that Zan had never been called by Beşiktaş in order to negotiate after his contract had been expired, which was dealt for two years within an optional second season. After 20 days with no proposal from the club, Zan have accepted Galatasaray's offer.

On 27 June 2011, Zan signed a new contract, with €700,000 per annum wage plus €20,000 per game. He scored his first goal for the club on the second half of the 2010–11 Süper Lig season which came in the first half as the game ended in a 1–1 draw against Kayserispor. Zan played 12 matches on the 2011–12 Süper Lig season and scored 2 goals, one against Eskişehirspor in 2–0 win and the other in a 4–0 win against Ankaragücü. He was part of Galatasaray's champion squad.

In early April 2013, his contract was extended for another two-years until 2015.

International career
Zan emerged as a key man for Turkey in their Euro 2008 qualifying push, starring in seven games for Fatih Terim's side. At the tournament itself, Zan made three appearances after he was initially injured in the opening game against Portugal. He has appeared in two qualifying matches for the 2010 FIFA World Cup.

Playing style
A tall, commanding central defender who plays with great pride and muscle but lacks agility and football intelligence. Another fault-line is his fragile physical make-up (which earned him the nickname the Glassman), but he has still managed to enjoy a fine career for club and country despite his flaws.

Career statistics

Club

International

Honours
Beşiktaş
Süper Lig: 2008–09
Türkiye Kupası: 2005–06, 2006–07, 2008–09
Süper Kupa: 2006

Galatasaray
Süper Lig: 2011–12, 2012–13, 2014–15
Türkiye Kupası:  2013–14
Süper Kupa: 2012, 2013

Turkey
 UEFA European Championship bronze medalist: 2008

References

External links

 Profile at Galatasaray.org
 
 
 
 
 
 
 

1981 births
Living people
People from Antakya
Turkish footballers
Turkey international footballers
Turkey under-21 international footballers
Süper Lig players
UEFA Euro 2008 players
Hatayspor footballers
Dardanelspor footballers
Beşiktaş J.K. footballers
Gaziantepspor footballers
Galatasaray S.K. footballers
Turkey youth international footballers
Association football central defenders
Sportspeople from Hatay